Donelaitis is a crater on Mercury.  Its name was adopted by the International Astronomical Union (IAU) on May 15, 2013. Donelaitis is named for the Lithuanian poet Kristijonas Donelaitis.

Around the central peak of Donelaitis crater is an irregular, U-shaped depression.  The depression is similar to those within Navoi, Lermontov, Scarlatti, and Praxiteles.  The depressions resemble those associated with volcanic explosions.  The irregular bright area of the crater floor including the depression was named Gata Facula in 2018.

References

Impact craters on Mercury